New York Jazz is an album by saxophonist Sonny Stitt recorded in 1956 and originally released on the Verve label.

Track listing 
All compositions by Sonny Stitt except as indicated
 "Norman's Blues " – 2:43
 "I Know That You Know" (Anne Caldwell, Vincent Youmans) – 4:29
 "If I Had You" (Jimmy Campbell, Reg Connelly, Ted Shapiro) – 6:19
 "Alone Together" (Howard Dietz, Arthur Schwartz) – 4:54
 "Twelfth Street Rag" (Euday L. Bowman) – 3:34
 "Down Home Blues (Funky Blues)" – 5:13
 "Sonny's Tune" – 5:32
 "Stars Fell on Alabama" (Mitchell Parish, Frank Perkins) – 4:11
 "Body and Soul" (Edward Heyman, Robert Sour, Frank Eyton, Johnny Green) – 4:31
 "Between the Devil and the Deep Blue Sea" (Harold Arlen, Ted Koehler) – 4:37

Personnel

Performance
 Sonny Stitt - alto saxophone, tenor saxophone
 Jimmy Jones – piano
 Ray Brown – bass
 Jo Jones - drums

References

1956 albums
Sonny Stitt albums
Albums produced by Norman Granz
Verve Records albums